In music, tone may refer to:

 Musical tone, a steady periodic sound.
 Whole tone, an interval of two semitones.

Music theory